Elachista cupreella is a moth in the family Elachistidae. It was described by Blanchard in 1852. It is found in Chile.

References

Moths described in 1852
cupreella
Moths of South America
Endemic fauna of Chile